The Brattsund Bridge is a cantilever bridge in the municipality of Meløy in Nordland county, Norway. It is part of the bridge connection between the islands of Åmøya and Grønøya, several small islands, and the mainland village of Engavågen. The bridge was constructed out of pre-stressed concrete.

See also
List of bridges in Norway
List of bridges in Norway by length
List of bridges
List of bridges by length

External links

Meløy
Road bridges in Nordland
Roads within the Arctic Circle